C. leucocephala may refer to:
 Caecilia leucocephala, an amphibian species found in Colombia, Ecuador and Panama
 Cladorhynchus leucocephala, a bird species in the genus Cladorhynchus
 Columba leucocephala, a synonym for Patagioenas leucocephala, the white-crowned pigeon, a bird species

See also
 Leucocephala (disambiguation)